Rakitno Field is a karst plateau and geographical region about 70 km2 in Bosnia and Herzegovina in an area of Široki Brijeg, West Herzegovina Canton.

Geography 
Rakitno, along with Posuško and Virsko polje, Tribistovo and the mountainous area around Blidinje Lake, is one of the four plateaus of the Posuško area. Around the center of the municipality, there are at the crossroads of important communications: Mostar - Imotski - Split, Mostar - Tomislavgrad - Livno, and Ploče - Ljubuški - Grude - Rama - Gornji Vakuf - Travnik.

To the northwest is the larger Duvanjsko field, to the west is the Posuško field with Posušje, and to the east is the Čabulja mountain. It stretches in a northwest-southeast direction. It is 8.5 km long and three kilometers wide with an area of 15 km2. The tributary of the Lištica Ugrovača flows through the field, which occasionally floods it. The altitude of the field is about 900 meters above sea level.

See also 
 List of karst plateaus in Bosnia and Herzegovina
 Posušje
 Poklečani
 Sutina
 Vrpolje

References 

Široki Brijeg
Karst fields of Bosnia and Herzegovina